The Centro Sportivo Carabinieri (also known as Carabinieri Bologna), is the sport section of the Italian armed force Carabinieri.

Sports
The disciplines of C.S. Carabinieri include:

Medal table

Update at the 4 May 2020.

All-time notable athletes

Alpine skiing
Giorgio Rocca
Alberto Tomba

Athletics
Michele Didoni
Alex Schwazer
Biathlon
Lukas Hofer
Bobsleigh
Günther Huber
Antonio Tartaglia

Cross-country skiing
Pietro Piller Cottrer
Giorgio Di Centa
Silvio Fauner

Equestrianism
Raimondo D'Inzeo

Fencing
Michele Maffei
Mauro Numa
Salvatore Sanzo
Arianna Errigo

Luge
Armin Zöggeler

Swimming
Marcello Guarducci

Taekwondo
Vito Dell'Aquila

See also
Italian military sports bodies

References

External links
  

Athletics clubs in Italy
Sports organizations established in 1964
1964 establishments in Italy
Carabinieri